Neorthopleura thoracica is a species of checkered beetle in the family Cleridae. It is found in the Caribbean Sea, Central America, and North America.

References

Further reading

 
 

Cleridae
Articles created by Qbugbot
Beetles described in 1823